Semecarpus anacardium, commonly known as the marking nut tree, Malacca bean tree, marany nut, oriental cashew, phobi nut tree and varnish tree, is a native of India, found in the outer Himalayas to the Coromandel Coast. It is closely related to the cashew.

Etymology
Semecarpus anacardium was called the "marking nut" by Europeans because it was used by washermen to mark cloth and clothing before washing, as it imparted a water insoluble mark to the cloth.

The specific epithet anacardium ("up-heart") was used by apothecaries in the 16th century to refer to the plant's fruit. It was later used by Linnaeus to refer to the cashew.

Description
It is a deciduous tree. Like the closely related cashew, the fruit is composed of two parts, a reddish-orange accessory fruit and a black drupe that grows at the end. The accessory fruit is edible and sweet when ripe, but the black fruit is toxic and produces a severe allergic reaction if it is consumed or its resin comes in contact with the skin. The seed inside the black fruit, known as godambi (गोडंबी), is edible when properly prepared.

Uses in Ayurvedic medicine

Semecarpus anacardium is used in Ayurvedic medicine for improving sexual power, increasing sperm count, curing diseases related to the digestive system, balancing phlegm (Sanskrit: kapha doṣa, कफ दोष), inducing abortion.  The red-orange part is collected and dried in the sun. It is consumed after it is semi-dried. It is also poisonous without any purification and the oil from its seeds can give blisters and painful wounds.

In medieval times, the plant was thought to aid in memory retention, for which cause the following dictum became widespread among Jewish scholars: "Repeat [your lessons], and repeat [your lessons], but never stand in need of the marking nut!"

References

Further reading
Puri, H. S.  (2003)  RASAYAN:  Ayurvedic Herbs for Longevity and Rejuvenation.  Taylor & Francis, London. pages 74–79.
Wealth of India, Raw Materials.  Vol IX, Council of Scientific and Industrial Research, New Delhi, 1972
Kleinsasser O., Tumors of the Larynx and Hypopharynx, Georg Thieme Verlag, Stuttgart, 1988.
Robin P.E., Reid A., Powell D.J. and McCnkey C.C., The Incidence of Cancer of the Larynx, Clinotolarygol, 1991, 16, 198–201.
Marck P.A. and Lupin A.J., Cancer of the Northern Alberta Experience, J otolaryngol, 1989, 18, 344–349.
Stephenson W.T., Barnes D.E., Holmes F.F. and Norris C.W, Gender Influences Subsite of Origin of Laryngeal Carcinoma, Arch otolaryngol head neck syrg., 1991, 117, 774–778.
Tuyns A.J., Laryngeal cancer, Cancer surv.,1994, 19–20, 159–173.
Martensson B., Epidermiological Aspects on Laryngeal Carcinoma in Scandina Via, Laryngoscope, 1975, 85, 1185–1189.
Yang P.C., Thomas D.B., Darling J.R. and Davis S., Differences in the Sex Ratio Of Laryngeal Cancer Incidence Rates By Anatomic Subsite, J clin epidemiol, 1989, 42, 755–758.
Kurup P.N., Ramdas V.N., Joshi P., In Handbook of Medicinal Plants, New Delhi, Oxford & IBH Publishing Co. Pvt. Ltd, 1979, 32.
Raghunath S., Mitra R., In: Pharmacognosy of Indigenous Drugs, New Delhi, Oxford & IBH Publishing Co. Pvt. Ltd, 1982,185.
Sharma A., Mathur R., Dixit V.P., Hypocholesterolemic Activity of Nutshell Extract of Semecarpus anacardium (Bhilawa) in Cholesterol Fed Rabbits, Ind J Expt Biol., 1995, 33, 444–8.
Freshney R.I., Culture of Animal Cells, A Manual of Basic Technique, 5th edition, Wiley-Liss, 200- 201.
Mohanta T.K., Patra J.K., Rath S.K., Pal D.K. and Thatoi H.N., Evaluation of Antimicrobial Activity and Phytochemical Screening of Oils and Nuts of Semicarpus Anacardium, Scientific Research and Essay, 2007, 11, 486–490.
Phillips H.J. and Terryberry J.E., Counting Actively Metabolizing Tissue Cultured Cells, Exp. Cell. Res., 1957, 13, 341–347.
Masters R.W., Animal Cell Culture, Third Edition, Cytotoxicity and Viability Assays.
Skehan P., Evaluation of Colorimetric Protein and Biomass Stains for Assaying Drug Effects Upon Human Tumor Cell Lines, Proc. Amer. Assoc. Cancer Res., 1989, 30, 2436
Skehan P., New Colorimetric Cytotoxicity Assay for Anticancer-Drug Screening, Journal National Cancer Institute, 1990, 82, 1107–1112.
Masters R.W., Animal Cell Culture, Cytotoxicity and Viability Assays, Third Edition, 202–203.

anacardium
Trees of the Indian subcontinent
Trees of Myanmar
Medicinal plants
Poisonous plants
Plants described in 1782